The 1963 Australian Track Cycling Championships were held from 2–9 March 1963. The amateur titles were held at the Hawthorne Park Velodrome in Brisbane, while the Professional titles were held concurrently at the Olympic Velodrome in Melbourne.

Amateur Championships
The amateur championships were held at the Hawthorne Park velodrome, Brisbane. The championships were marred by a bad fall when ex-Olympian Lionel Cox fell and crashed head first into a lamp post. Visiting riders believed this (and other falls) were in part due to the poor track conditions.

Healing Shield Winners: TBC

Professional Championships
The professional championships were held at the Olympic Velodrome in Melbourne, with some events being held on the same night as the 1963 Austral Wheel Race. The championships brought together Australia's best professional sprinters, including Ron Grenda, Barry Waddell, Sid Patterson and Dick Ploog. Grenda was the upset winner in the 1,000m sprint, after Barry Waddell was disqualified in the final. The 1963 championships also saw the emergence of Graeme Gilmore (racing as a junior), who later went on to win multiple local and international races

Rubina Joy Cup: Tasmania

References 

Australian Track Cycling Championships
1963 in Australian sport
1963 in track cycling
March 1963 sports events in Australia